The 2016 German Grand Prix (formally known as the Formula 1 Grosser Preis von Deutschland 2016) was a Formula One motor race that took place on 31 July 2016. After a one-year absence, the race returned to the Hockenheimring near Hockenheim in the German state of Baden-Württemberg, which last held the race in 2014. It was the twelfth round of the 2016 FIA Formula One World Championship, and marked the seventy-sixth running of the German Grand Prix, and the sixty-second time the race has been run as a round of the Formula One World Championship.

Lewis Hamilton entered the round with a six-point lead in the World Drivers' Championship over teammate and defending race winner Nico Rosberg. Hamilton won the race and extended his lead over Rosberg to nineteen points. Their team, Mercedes, further extended its lead in the World Constructors' Championship.

Report
In the week before the race, MRT driver Rio Haryanto was the subject of increased media scrutiny amidst reports that his primary sponsor—Indonesian petrochemical company Pertamina—had not met its financial obligations to the team, thus placing his future with MRT and in the sport in jeopardy. Haryanto was ultimately able to secure the seat for the race, but his long-term future with the team remained in doubt.

Following the handing out of several controversial penalties and extensive debate over the application of amendments to the sporting regulations, the FIA repealed all of the rules restricting pit-to-car communications.

This was the first Grand Prix that double yellow flags would be the same as a red flag in qualifying after the controversial qualifying in the Hungarian Grand Prix.

Tyre supplier Pirelli provided teams with the medium, soft and supersoft compounds.

In the race itself Lewis Hamilton won claiming his 4th victory in a row to move into a 19-point lead in the Championship, Daniel Ricciardo came home 2nd ahead of his teammate Max Verstappen, Nico Rosberg slipped back to 4th after being penalised for forcing Verstappen off the track.

Classification

Qualifying

Notes:
 – Nico Hülkenberg received a one-place grid penalty for incorrectly using his tyre allocation during the first part of qualifying.
 – Carlos Sainz Jr. received a three-place grid penalty for impeding Felipe Massa during qualifying.
 – Romain Grosjean received a five-place grid penalty for an unscheduled gearbox change.

Race

Championship standings after the race

Drivers' Championship standings

Constructors' Championship standings

 Note: Only the top five positions are included for both sets of standings.

See also 
 2016 Hockenheimring GP2 Series round
 2016 Hockenheimring GP3 Series round

References

External links

German
Grand Prix
German Grand Prix
German Grand Prix